Carmichael, acquired by Simon Carmichael International Group Ltd., now known as SIG, is a British manufacturer of specialist fire-fighting vehicles in Worcester, member of Guangdong Yongqiang Auld Lang Real International Fire Fighting Vehicles Ltd.

History

It was formed in 1849 as a coachbuilders.

Fire service vehicles
Carmichael & Sons made its first fire engines in 1947 for the Worcester Fire Brigade (now part of the Hereford and Worcester Fire and Rescue Service).

In 1962 it made its first fire tender for airfields (airport crash tender).

Ownership
In the 1970s it was known as Carmichael Fire & Bulk Ltd. 

In 1992 it became Carmichael International Ltd (CIL) and was liquidated in 2004., 

AMDAC Carmichael Ltd (ACL) bought all assets of CIL and continued all operations with the UK. ACL went into Liquidation in 2016. 

Carmichael Support Services Ltd bought all assets of ACL and continue to trade, manufacture and support fire and rescue vehicles at the former ACL Facility in Worcester UK.  Carmichael Support Services Limited changed its trading name to CSS Fire Vehicles Limited on 26 January 2018.

Structure
It is situated in the south-west of Worcester, east of the A449 on the Venture Business Park, near Lower Wick, and next door to Worcester Citizens' Swimming Pool.

Products
It makes fire tenders for many of the UK's fire services. It has also made tankers for road vehicle transport. It makes fire tenders for airports and RAF stations.

See also
 :Category:Aircraft fires
 Airport rescue and firefighting services in the United Kingdom
 Fire appliances in the United Kingdom
 Terberg and Schopf, manufacturer of similar vehicles

References

External links
 Amdac-Carmichael

Fire service vehicle manufacturers
Coachbuilders of the United Kingdom
Motor vehicle manufacturers of England
Manufacturing companies based in Worcester, England
History of Worcester, England
Vehicle manufacturing companies established in 1849
1849 establishments in England